Lovro Grajfoner (born 25 January 2000) is a Slovenian professional footballer who plays as a defensive midfielder for Ukrainian Premier League club Mynai.

References

External links
 
 

2000 births
Living people
Sportspeople from Maribor
Slovenian footballers
Slovenia youth international footballers
Association football midfielders
NK Maribor players
NK Drava Ptuj (2004) players
NK Aluminij players
Akritas Chlorakas players
FC Mynai players
Slovenian PrvaLiga players
Slovenian Second League players
Cypriot Second Division players
Slovenian expatriate footballers
Expatriate footballers in Cyprus
Slovenian expatriate sportspeople in Cyprus
Expatriate footballers in Ukraine
Slovenian expatriate sportspeople in Ukraine